The Journal of Automated Reasoning was established in 1983 by Larry Wos, who was its editor in chief until 1992. It covers research and advances in automated reasoning, mechanical verification of theorems, and other deductions in classical and non-classical logic.

The journal is published by Springer Science+Business Media. As of 2021, the editor-in-chief is Jasmin Blanchette, an associate professor of computer science at the Vrije Universiteit Amsterdam. The journal's 2019 impact factor is 1.431, and it is indexed by several science indexing services, including the Science Citation Index Expanded and Scopus.

References

External links 
 

Computer science journals
Logic journals
English-language journals
Publications established in 1983
Logic in computer science
Formal methods publications
Springer Science+Business Media academic journals